The Narrows is a northern inner suburb of the city of Darwin, Northern Territory, Australia.

History
It is named after the narrow land between Ludmilla and Sadgrove Creeks.

The Narrows appeared on early plans of Darwin and was retained as a suburb name when the area of land south of the RAAF Base was subdivided in 1960.

References

External links

 https://web.archive.org/web/20080123190745/http://www.nt.gov.au/lands/lis/placenames/origins/greaterdarwin.shtml#t

Suburbs of Darwin, Northern Territory